Actual Miles: Henley's Greatest Hits is the first greatest hits compilation album by American singer-songwriter Don Henley, released in 1995. The album was the first compilation album released by Henley and it covered hits from all three of his solo albums throughout the 1980s. The album features three new songs, "The Garden of Allah", "You Don't Know Me at All", and Henley's cover of "Everybody Knows". The collection peaked at No. 48 on the charts and reached platinum status. "The Garden of Allah" reached No. 16 on the Mainstream Rock Tracks chart.

Album cover
The photograph on the cover half-jokingly depicts Henley as a cigar-smoking used car salesman, which Don himself was asked about by David Letterman following a 1995 performance on The Late Show. Henley explained that the picture and album title was a subtle satire on the record industry.

Track listing
"Dirty Laundry" (Henley, Danny Kortchmar) – 5:36
"The Boys of Summer" (Mike Campbell, Henley) – 4:45
"All She Wants to Do Is Dance" (Kortchmar) – 4:28
"Not Enough Love in the World" (Henley, Kortchmar, Benmont Tench) – 3:54
"Sunset Grill" (Henley, Kortchmar, Tench) – 6:22
"The End of the Innocence" (Henley, Bruce Hornsby) – 5:14
"The Last Worthless Evening" (John Corey, Henley, Stan Lynch) – 6:05
"New York Minute" (Henley, Kortchmar, Jai Winding) – 6:34
"I Will Not Go Quietly" (Henley, Kortchmar) – 5:41
"The Heart of the Matter" (Campbell, Henley, J.D. Souther) – 5:21
"The Garden of Allah" (Corey, Paul Gurian, Henley, Lynch) – 7:02
"You Don't Know Me at All" (Corey, Henley, Lynch) – 5:36
"Everybody Knows" (Leonard Cohen, Sharon Robinson) – 6:10

Personnel
Musicians and Vocals (Tracks 11–13)
 Don Henley
 John Corey (11, 12)
 Sheryl Crow (11)
 Danny Kortchmar (11)
 Stan Lynch (11, 12)
 Benmont Tench (13)
 Scott Plunkett (13)
 Frank Simes (12)
 Jimmy Rip (13)
 Neil Stubenhaus 
 Timothy B. Schmit (12)
 Vinnie Colaiuta (11, 12)
 Scott Crago (13)
 Carmen Twillie (13)
 Julia Waters (11, 13)
 Maxine Waters (11, 13)
 Mindy Stein (12)

Production (Tracks 11–13)
 Don Henley – producer 
 Stan Lynch – producer 
 John Corey – producer (11, 12)
 Rob Jacobs – mixing, engineer (11, 12), recording (13)
 Roger Sommers – additional engineer (11, 12)
 Bill Dooley – additional engineer (13)
 Jim Labinski – assistant engineer (11)
 Chad Munsey – assistant engineer (11, 13)
 Krish Sharma – assistant engineer (12)
 John Aguto – assistant engineer (13)
 Michael W. Douglass – assistant engineer (13)
 Barry Goldberg – assistant engineer (13)
 Dave Collins – mastering at A&M Masterin Studios (Hollywood, California)
 Julie Larson – production coordinator (13)
 Frank W. Ockenfels 3 – photography 
 Janet Wolsborn – art direction
 Robin Sloane – creative direction

Charts

Weekly charts

Year-end charts

References

1995 greatest hits albums
Don Henley albums
Albums produced by Greg Ladanyi
albums produced by Danny Kortchmar
Geffen Records compilation albums